Rainer Würdig (born 18 April 1947) is an East German former handball player who competed in the 1972 Summer Olympics.

He was born in Holzdorf (Jessen).

In 1972 he was part of the East German team which finished fourth in the Olympic tournament. He played two matches and scored two goals.

External links
https://www.olympedia.org/athletes/31752
profile

1947 births
Living people
People from Saxony-Anhalt
German male handball players
Olympic handball players of East Germany
Handball players at the 1972 Summer Olympics
Sportspeople from Schleswig-Holstein